Euphorbia acanthothamnos, is a species of flowering plant, belonging to the family Euphorbiaceae.

Description 
It is a shrub that reaches 30 cm in height. It forms a thorny cushion that blooms from March to June. It grows mainly in limestone areas.

Distribution 
It is endemic to the eastern Mediterranean, Crete, Greece, and Turkey. It grows from sea level to more than 2000 meters.

Taxonomy 
Euphorbia acanthothamnos was described by Heldr. & Sart. ex Boiss. and published in Diagnoses Plantarum Orientalium Novarum , ser. 2, 4: 1859. 86. 

Acanthothamnos is an epithet that means "thorny bush" in Greek.

References 

acanthothamnos
acanthothamnos